Sam Simpson (born 14 June 1998) is a professional Australian rules footballer playing for the Geelong Football Club in the Australian Football League (AFL). The son of former Geelong player, Sean Simpson, he was drafted by Geelong with their fourth selection and fifty-third overall in the 2017 rookie draft under the father–son rule. He made his debut in the draw against  at Spotless Stadium in round fifteen of the 2017 season.

Statistics
Updated to the end of the 2022 season.

|-
| 2017 ||  || 37
| 5 || 2 || 1 || 26 || 30 || 56 || 12 || 5 || 0.4 || 0.2 || 5.2 || 6.0 || 11.2 || 2.4 || 1.0
|-
| 2018 ||  || 37
| 1 || 0 || 0 || 3 || 4 || 7 || 3 || 2 || 0.0 || 0.0 || 3.0 || 4.0 || 7.0 || 3.0 || 2.0
|-
| 2019 ||  || 37
| 0 || – || – || – || – || – || – || – || – || – || – || – || – || – || –
|-
| 2020 ||  || 37
| 9 || 3 || 2 || 60 || 65 || 125 || 23 || 28 || 0.3 || 0.2 || 6.7 || 7.2 || 13.9 || 2.6 || 3.1
|-
| 2021 ||  || 37
| 4 || 2 || 2 || 28 || 25 || 53 || 13 || 8 || 0.5 || 0.5 || 7.0 || 6.3 || 13.3 || 3.3 || 2.0
|-
| 2022 ||  || 37
| 0 || – || – || – || – || – || – || – || – || – || – || – || – || – || –
|- class=sortbottom
! colspan=3 | Career
! 19 !! 7 !! 5 !! 117 !! 124 !! 241 !! 51 !! 43 !! 0.5 !! 0.5 !! 7.0 !! 6.3 !! 13.3 !! 3.3 !! 2.0
|}

Notes

Honours and achievements
Team
 2× McClelland Trophy: 2019, 2022

Individual
Geelong F.C. VFL Best & Fairest: 2019

References

External links

1998 births
Living people
Geelong Football Club players
Geelong Falcons players
Australian rules footballers from Victoria (Australia)